FinanceAsia is a Hong Kong-based publication reporting on Asia’s financial and capital markets through a daily website and monthly magazine. At the end of 2005, FinanceAsia was acquired by Haymarket Group, the largest privately owned publishing company in the UK, created in part by Lord Heseltine, the former UK deputy prime minister.

FinanceAsia magazine
FinanceAsia was established in 1996 as a monthly magazine and is published 10 times a year. It organises annual awards for Asia's financial industry, the FinanceAsia Achievement Awards, which each year recognise the region's most significant transactions and the financial institutions that advised on them. The trophies are given out at a black-tie dinner at the start of the year.

FinanceAsia also organises local awards in most countries in Asia, as well as product-specific awards. Other regular features include:
 The Rich List, annual research identifying Asia's biggest dividend earners
 Best Managed Companies Poll, an annual poll to find Asia's top companies

FinanceAsia.com
Since 2000, FinanceAsia's monthly magazine has been accompanied by a website that reports daily on capital markets transactions, financial developments and industry hires.

FinanceAsia Conferences
FinanceAsia also organises numerous conferences throughout the region, focusing on investment, capital raising and corporate treasury. In 2010, its conference schedule included the following events:
 Brazil Investment Summit - The Conrad, Hong Kong
 Corporate Treasury Summit Indonesia 2010 - Mandarin Oriental, Jakarta, Indonesia
 Infrastructure Philippines - The Manila Marriott Hotel, Pasay, Philippines
 2nd Annual Corporate Treasury Summit Philippines 2010 - Makati Shangri-La, Philippines
 Asia-Pacific Debt Investor Forum - The Conrad, Hong Kong
 2nd Annual Global Recovery Investing Summit: Maximizing Opportunities in Distressed and Troubled Assets - Renaissance Harbour View Hotel, Hong Kong

FinanceAsia iPad/iPhone App
 FinanceAsia for iPad
 FinanceAsia for iPhone

External links
 Official website
 Official Chinese website

Business magazines
Magazines published in Hong Kong
Magazines established in 1996
Monthly magazines
Ten times annually magazines